German submarine U-473 was a Type VIIC U-boat of Nazi Germany's Kriegsmarine during World War II.

She carried out two patrols. She caused a warship to be declared a total loss.

She was sunk by British warships west southwest of Ireland on 6 May 1944.

Design
German Type VIIC submarines were preceded by the shorter Type VIIB submarines. U-473 had a displacement of  when at the surface and  while submerged. She had two shafts and two  propellers.

U-473 was fitted with five  torpedo tubes (four fitted at the bow and one at the stern), fourteen torpedoes, one  SK C/35 naval gun, 220 rounds, and one twin  C/30 anti-aircraft gun. The boat had a complement of between forty-four and sixty.

Service history
The submarine was laid down on 1 December 1941 at the Deutsche Werke in Kiel as yard number 304, launched on 17 April 1943 and commissioned on 16 June under the command of Kapitänleutnant Heinz Sternberg.

She served with the 5th U-boat Flotilla from 16 June 1943 for training and the 9th U-boat Flotilla from 1 January 1944 for operations.

1st patrol
U-473s first patrol was preceded by a short journey from Kiel in Germany to Bergen in Norway. The patrol itself began when the boat departed Bergen on 27 March 1944. She passed through the gap separating Iceland and the Faroe Islands and out into the Atlantic Ocean. She docked at Lorient in occupied France on 18 April.

2nd patrol and loss
The U-boat departed Lorient on 24 April 1944 for her second foray. On the 28th, she was attacked by a Handley Page Halifax of No. 58 Squadron RAF. No damage was inflicted on U-473 but the aircraft was hit five times before only just returning to base.

She was attacked again by a Polish-manned Vickers Wellington of 304 Squadron a day later. The boat was not damaged in this inconclusive encounter, but kept the aircraft at a respectful distance for an hour.

U-473 torpedoed the American destroyer  on 3 May 1944. The warship did not sink; the U-boat dived deep to evade other convoy escorts and sustained slight damage from their depth charges.

On 6 May U-473 was detected by units of Britain's 2nd Support Group, and subjected to a prolonged "hunt to exhaustion". The U-boat attempted to flee on the surface, but was brought under heavy gunfire from the three warships. Her captain and members of her crew were killed, and the survivors abandoned ship. The deserted U-boat, still running at high speed, headed straight for Starling which was obliged to take evasive action. Continuous gunfire from the three ships caused the U-boat to sink stern-first, at position . Two explosions, possibly scuttling charges, finished the submarine off.

Twenty-three men went down with U-473; there were thirty survivors.

Summary of raiding history

References

Notes

Citations

Bibliography

External links

German Type VIIC submarines
U-boats commissioned in 1943
U-boats sunk in 1944
U-boats sunk by depth charges
U-boats sunk by British warships
1943 ships
Ships built in Kiel
World War II submarines of Germany
World War II shipwrecks in the Atlantic Ocean
Maritime incidents in May 1944